High Top Mountain is the debut studio album by American country music singer-songwriter Sturgill Simpson. The album was produced by Dave Cobb and was released on June 11, 2013. Simpson self-funded the album. The record is named after a cemetery near Jackson, Kentucky where many of his family are buried.

Reception

Stephen Thomas Erlewine of AllMusic rated High Top Mountain 3 1/2 stars out of 5, comparing its sound favorably to Waylon Jennings. Erik Ernst of the Milwaukee Journal-Sentinel also compared it to Jennings, saying that it had "rich vintage sounds, heartbreaking ballads and juke-joint ramblers".

Track listing

Chart performance
The album did not receive much attention on its release and debuted at No. 47 on the Top Country Albums chart.  It re-entered the chart after the release of Simpson's second album Metamodern Sounds in Country Music, eventually reaching No. 31 on Top Country Albums for the chart dated November 8, 2014. The album has sold 105,600 copies in the United States as of January 2017.

Personnel

Musicians and contributors 
Sturgill Simpson - vocals, acoustic guitar, Telecaster 
Hargus "Pig" Robbins - piano 
Chris Powell - drums 
Robby Turner - steel guitar, bass (tracks 1, 2, 3, 5, 7, 8, 10) 
Brian "Freedom Eagle Bear" Allen - bass (tracks 4, 6, 9, 11, 12) 
Bobby "Diamond Bob" Emmett - organ, Mellotron 
Leroy Powell - steel guitar (tracks 6, 9), backing vocals (track 6) 
Dave Cobb - 12 string electric guitar (track 7)

Technical personnel
Produced by Dave Cobb 
Engineered by Vance Powell 
Assistant Engineered by Jason Mott 
Mixed by Vance Powell at Sputnik Sound - Nashville, TN 
 Mastering by Richard Dodd

References

Sturgill Simpson albums
2013 debut albums
Albums produced by Dave Cobb
Loose Music albums